This is a list of reeves and mayors of Scarborough, Ontario. The township of Scarborough was created in 1850.  The head of the local government was a reeve until the incorporation of Scarborough as a borough in 1967, at which point the head of the local government was styled as mayor and continued after becoming a city in 1983.  Since 1998, Scarborough has been a community within the city of Toronto, and the head of the local government is the Mayor of Toronto.

Township Reeves
1850 : Peter Secor - former postmaster and associated with William Lyon Mackenzie
1851 - 1853 : John P. Wheler
1854 : John Torrance - surveyor and owner of several farms near McCowan Road and Eglinton Avenue East
1855 - 1864 : John P. Wheler - second term
1865 : Donald G. Stephenson - farmer
1866 : Thomas Brown
1867 - 1870 : George Chester
1871 - 1875 : John P. Wheler - third term
1876 : George Chester - second term
1877 - 1880: Donald G. Stephenson - second term
1881 - 1894 : John Richardson
1895 : James Chester
1896 - 1901 : Lyman Kennedy
1902 - 1907 : Alfred Young
1908 - 1912 : William D. Annis
1913 - 1919 : James George Cornell - related to earlier settler William Cornell
1920 - 1921 : James T. Stewart
1922 : E.M. Croker
1923 - 1925 : Robert McCowan
1926 : T.E. Allen
1927 : George Moore
1928 - 1931 : George Burnfield Little
1932 : F.L. Barchard
1933 - 1934 : T.H. Sanders
1935 : George Moore
1936 - 1938 : B.J. Wheeler
1939 - 1945 : Burton L. Clutterbuck
1946 : Allan P. Wheler
1947 : R.H. Palmer
1948 - 1955 : Oliver E. Crockford - helped develop the Golden Mile, and Scarborough General Hospital. 
1956 : Augustus (Gus) Harris - served later as mayor
1957 - 1967 : Albert Campbell - later Metro Chairman.

Borough Mayors

After 1967, the title of reeve of the Township of Scarborough was changed to the Mayor of the Borough of Scarborough:

1967 - 1969 : Albert Campbell - resigned to become Metro Chairman. 
1969 - 1972 : Robert W. White - in office for construction of Scarborough Civic Centre and Scarborough Town Centre. 
1973 - 1978 : Paul Cosgrove - resigned to become a Liberal MP. Later served as a federal cabinet minister and a judge.
1978 : Ken Morrish - interim
1979 - 1983 : Gus Harris - had previously served as reeve in the 1950s.

City Mayors

Scarborough became a city in 1983 with the former mayor of the borough becoming mayor of the city. After 1998, the Mayor of Scarborough ceased to exist and was replaced by the Mayor of Toronto.

1983 - 1988 : Gus Harris
1988 - 1994 : Joyce Trimmer - first woman elected mayor. 
1994 - 1998 : Frank Faubert - had previously served as an MPP in the provincial legislature.

Board of Control
Scarborough had a Board of Control from 1966 until it was abolished with the 1988 election and replaced by directly elected Metro Councillors. The Board of Control consisted of four Controllers elected at large and the mayor and served as the executive committee of Scarborough Council. Controllers concurrently sat on Metropolitan Toronto Council

Names in boldface indicate Controllers that were or became Mayor of Scarborough in other years.

X = elected as Controller
A = appointed Controller to fill a vacancy

M = sitting as Mayor

From 1966 to abolition

References
 A History of Scarborough, ed. Robert R. Bonis (1965)

External links

 Reeves and Mayors of Scarborough

Scarborough

Scarborough